Fetters Hot Springs-Agua Caliente is a census-designated place (CDP) in Sonoma Valley, Sonoma County, California, in the United States. As of the 2010 census, the CDP population was 4,144. The name Agua Caliente translates into English, from Spanish, as hot water, referring to the hot springs historically found in the area.

Geography
Over time, the boundaries between these four communities became blurred and they are often grouped together and referred to collectively as "the Springs" area of Sonoma Valley.

History

The area was first occupied by Indigenous peoples who discovered and used the hot springs that the area is named after. In 1849 Thaddeus M. Leavenworth acquired 320 acres of the Rancho in what became present-day Agua Caliente, Fetters Hot Springs, Boyes Hot Springs, and part of Maxwell Farm. In 1889, property was being sold in the area as being near the "celebrated old Indian Medicine Spring."

George and Emma Fetters opened the Fetters Hot Springs resort in 1908. Flamboyant restaurateur Juanita Musson opened her second Sonoma Valley restaurant in the old Fetters hotel around 1970, but it burned to the ground five years later. The land stood vacant for almost forty years until the Fetters Apartments, built as affordable housing for sixty families, opened in 2017.

Gallery

Demographics

2010
At the 2010 census Fetters Hot Springs-Agua Caliente had a population of 4,144. The racial makeup of Fetters Hot Springs-Agua Caliente was 2,926 (70.6%) White, 25 (0.6%) African American, 39 (0.9%) Native American, 68 (1.6%) Asian, 8 (0.2%) Pacific Islander, 895 (21.6%) from other races, and 183 (4.4%) from two or more races. Hispanic or Latino of any race were 1,925 persons (46.5%).

The census reported that 99.6% of the population lived in households and 0.4% lived in non-institutionalized group quarters.

There were 1,419 households, 570 (40.2%) had children under the age of 18 living in them, 709 (50.0%) were opposite-sex married couples living together, 175 (12.3%) had a female householder with no husband present, 86 (6.1%) had a male householder with no wife present.  There were 90 (6.3%) unmarried opposite-sex partnerships, and 30 (2.1%) same-sex married couples or partnerships. 327 households (23.0%) were one person and 108 (7.6%) had someone living alone who was 65 or older. The average household size was 2.91.  There were 970 families (68.4% of households); the average family size was 3.46.

The age distribution was 1,137 people (27.4%) under the age of 18, 409 people (9.9%) aged 18 to 24, 1,070 people (25.8%) aged 25 to 44, 1,148 people (27.7%) aged 45 to 64, and 380 people (9.2%) who were 65 or older.  The median age was 34.8 years. For every 100 females, there were 98.8 males.  For every 100 females age 18 and over, there were 97.1 males.

The homeowner vacancy rate was 2.4%; the rental vacancy rate was 8.0%. 51.4% of the population lived in owner-occupied housing units and 48.2% lived in rental housing units.

2000
At the 2000 census there were 2,505 people, 885 households, and 584 families in the CDP. The racial makeup of the CDP was 82.55% White, 0.96% African American, 1.12% Native American, 1.20% Asian, 0.16% Pacific Islander, 8.70% from other races, and 5.31% from two or more races. Hispanic or Latino of any race were 29.90%.

Of the 885 households 36.2% had children under the age of 18 living with them, 45.2% were married couples living together, 14.8% had a female householder with no husband present, and 33.9% were non-families. 25.5% of households were one person and 6.6% were one person aged 65 or older.  The average household size was 2.78 and the average family size was 3.32.

The age distribution was 27.3% under the age of 18, 10.5% from 18 to 24, 31.7% from 25 to 44, 22.8% from 45 to 64, and 7.7% 65 or older.  The median age was 34 years. For every 100 females, there were 94.8 males.  For every 100 females age 18 and over, there were 93.9 males.

The median household income was $44,097 and the median family income  was $48,641. Males had a median income of $37,143 versus $28,304 for females. The per capita income for the CDP was $20,269.  About 5.5% of families and 8.3% of the population were below the poverty line, including 6.6% of those under age 18 and 6.0% of those age 65 or over.

Government

References

Census-designated places in Sonoma County, California
Sonoma Valley
Census-designated places in California